Peter John Turner is a New Zealand former professional rugby league footballer who played in the 1950s.

Playing career

International honours
Peter Turner represented New Zealand in 1959 against Australia.

References

External links

Search for "Peter" at rugbyleagueproject.org
Search for "John" at rugbyleagueproject.org
Search for "Turner" at rugbyleagueproject.org

New Zealand national rugby league team players
New Zealand rugby league players
Place of birth missing (living people)
Living people
Rugby league props
Wellington rugby league team players
Year of birth missing (living people)